Descendants: Wicked World (also abbreviated simply as Wicked World) is a computer-animated short-form series based on the Disney Channel Original Movie Descendants. It premiered on September 18, 2015 on Disney Channel and its digital platforms, including WATCH Disney Channel, and ended on March 3, 2017.

The series picks up after the first film and introduces new characters from the Isle of the Lost and Auradon. Providing the voices of the animated characters are Dove Cameron as Mal, Sofia Carson as Evie, Cameron Boyce as Carlos, Booboo Stewart as Jay, Mitchell Hope as Ben, Sarah Jeffery as Audrey, Brenna D'Amico as Jane, Dianne Doan as Lonnie, Ursula Taherian as Jordan, China Anne McClain in Season 1 and Lauryn McClain in Season 2 as Freddie, Jennifer Veal as Ally, Myrna Velasco as CJ and Bradley Steven Perry as Zevon.

It is also the first Disney Channel Original Series based on a Disney Channel Original Movie.

Plot
After Ben's coronation in Descendants, the villain kids Mal, Evie, Carlos and Jay settle in at being good while their villainous parents are still roaming the Isle of the Lost. The story goes deeper at the arrival of new villain kids, Freddie (Dr. Facilier's daughter), CJ (Captain Hook's daughter) and Zevon (Yzma's son).

Characters

Villain Kids 
 Mal (voiced by Dove Cameron) – Daughter of Maleficent and Hades. She possesses dark forms of magic, passed down to her by her mother, but because she is good now, she uses her magic for good purposes.
 Evie (voiced by Sofia Carson) – Daughter of The Evil Queen and Mal's best friend. She has a love of fashion and wields a Magic Mirror that knows everything.
 Carlos (voiced by Cameron Boyce) – Son of Cruella de Vil. He can talk to dogs and has claustrophobia as revealed in "Spirit Day" and "Trapped", respectively.
 Jay (voiced by Booboo Stewart) – Son of Jafar. Despite having chosen to be good, he has a bad habit of stealing.
 Freddie (voiced by China Anne McClain in Season 1, Lauryn McClain in Season 2) – Daughter of Dr. Facilier. Despite initially having a difficult to Auradon's unrotten ways, she had no problem adapting to the delicious food. She is the sister of Celia from Descendants 3. Also, she appears in the Descendants novel Return to the Isle of the Lost.
 CJ (voiced by Myrna Velasco) – Daughter of Captain Hook and Freddie's best friend. She is the sister of Harry Hook from Descendants 2.
 Zevon (voiced by Bradley Steven Perry) – Son of Yzma. In the second season, he plans to fuse the VK's birthright jewels so he can combine their power and take over Auradon.

Auradon Kids 
 Ben (voiced by Mitchell Hope) – Son of Belle and the Beast and Mal's boyfriend. He is the current king of Auradon.
 Audrey (voiced by Sarah Jeffery) – Daughter of Aurora and Prince Phillip. She was initially mistrustful towards the villain kids, especially Mal, but is learning to warm up to their presence.
 Jane (voiced by Brenna D'Amico) – Daughter of The Fairy Godmother. Like Mal, she has magic, but unlike Mal, she has light forms of magic and isn't fully trained in her magic yet.
 Lonnie (voiced by Dianne Doan) – Daughter of Fa Mulan and Li Shang. Unlike Audrey, she is friendly towards the VKs and is willing to help them adapt in Auradon.
 Jordan (voiced by Ursula Taherian) – Daughter of The Genie. She runs a web show and lives in a magic lamp. Also, she appears in the Descendants novel Return to the Isle of the Lost.
 Ally (voiced by Jennifer Veal) – Daughter of Alice. She has the same curious personality as her mother. Also, she appears in the Descendants novel Return to the Isle of the Lost.

Production
The production of the series was announced right after the film Descendants finished airing on Disney Channel.  Former Phineas and Ferb storyboard artist Aliki Theofilopoulos Grafft announced on Twitter that she was directing the series, with Jenni Cook as producer, and that the original cast would be reprising their roles. Each episode of the series is going to be under five minutes long.

On July 13, 2016, it was announced the series was renewed for a second season and that Bradley Steven Perry would be added to the cast as Zevon, the son of Yzma from The Emperor's New Groove, and Lauryn McClain would take over voicing Freddie from her sister China Anne McClain who was cast as Ursula's daughter Uma in Descendants 2.

Episodes

Accolades

References

Notes

External links
 

2010s American animated television series
2015 American television series debuts
2017 American television series endings
2010s Canadian animated television series
2015 Canadian television series debuts
2017 Canadian television series endings
Disney Channel original programming
American computer-animated television series
American children's animated fantasy television series
American children's animated comedy television series
American children's animated musical television series
Canadian computer-animated television series
Canadian children's animated fantasy television series
Canadian children's animated comedy television series
Canadian children's animated musical television series
Television series based on Disney films
Television series by Disney Television Animation
Descendants (franchise)
Television shows filmed in Vancouver